Pseudograpsus is a genus of crabs, containing the following species:
Pseudograpsus albus Stimpson, 1858
Pseudograpsus crassus A. Milne-Edwards, 1868
Pseudograpsus elongatus (A. Milne-Edwards, 1873)
Pseudograpsus intermedius Chhapgar, 1955
Pseudograpsus nudus Stimpson, 1858
Pseudograpsus setosus (Fabricius, 1798)

References

Grapsoidea
Taxa named by Henri Milne-Edwards